Raffaele Ciappa (born Fanno 1760 - died after 1820s) was an Italian painter, active in a Neoclassical style. He was active mostly as a copyist and restorer.

Biography
He was active in Naples. Along with Andrea Celestino, he help restore and design protections for antique Roman fresco paintings at Pompei. In Naples, among his pupils were Giuliano Crognale and Raffaele Carelli.

References

1760 births
Year of death missing
18th-century Italian painters
Italian male painters
19th-century Italian painters
Italian neoclassical painters
Painters from Naples
19th-century Italian male artists
18th-century Italian male artists